Paula Einöder (Montevideo, 11 September 1974) is a Uruguayan poet, writer and English teacher.

Life 
In 2001 she graduated from the Facultad de Humanidades y Ciencias de la Educación in Uruguay with a bachelor's degree in Literature.

Work 
 La escritura de arcilla (2002)
 Árbol experimental (2004) 
 opacidad (2010)
 árbol de arco (baladas) (2020)
para bálsamo de ruiseñores (2021)

External links 
http://www.mec.gub.uy/innovaportal/v/20659/39/innova.front/ein%C3%B6der_paula?carpeta=19844
http://www.palabraserrantes.com/category/writers/paula-einoder/

1974 births
Living people
People from Montevideo
21st-century Uruguayan poets
Uruguayan women poets
21st-century Uruguayan women writers